The High Service Water Tower and Reservoir, colloquially known as the Tower Hill Tower, is a public water supply facility off Massachusetts Route 110 in Lawrence, Massachusetts. The reservoir was constructed in 1874–75 to provide the city's public water supply, with a gatehouse designed by Charles T. Emerson, a Lawrence architect. The tower was built in 1896 as a high pressure standpipe or water tower. It is Romanesque in its style, and was designed by George G. Adams, a noted local architect who had been taught by Emerson. The area above the standpipe includes a balcony capped by a chateauesque roof, with round-arch windows providing views of the area. The main tower is octagonal in shape, with a narrow round staircase tower projection from one side.

The neighborhood surrounding the tower is known as Tower Hill, for obvious reasons. Although the hill and its accompanying neighborhood are associated with Lawrence, and the tower itself is located in, a small sliver of Tower Hill actually extends into the neighboring city of Methuen. Thus, it is sometimes necessary to clarify whether one is speaking of Tower Hill, Methuen or Tower Hill, Lawrence.

The tower and reservoir were listed on the National Register of Historic Places in 1978.

See also
National Register of Historic Places listings in Lawrence, Massachusetts
National Register of Historic Places listings in Essex County, Massachusetts

References

Buildings and structures in Lawrence, Massachusetts
Industrial buildings and structures on the National Register of Historic Places in Massachusetts
Towers in Massachusetts
Reservoirs in Massachusetts
National Register of Historic Places in Lawrence, Massachusetts
Lakes of Essex County, Massachusetts